Divya Shakti is a 1993 Bollywood action film directed and written by Sameer Malkan. The film stars Ajay Devgan, Raveena Tandon in lead roles.

Plot 
Prashant Verma (Ajay Devgn) is a journalist and is in love with Priya (Raveena Tandon) He gets weary and tired of witnessing the reign of crime, police corruption and injustice in his city and decides to wage a one-man war against the psychotic king maker "Tau" (Amrish Puri). His journey costs him his limbs and loved ones as he goes on a vigilante style brute-fest right into the lair and dark world of the two-faced Tau and his cronies. Death and destruction follow the warpath.

Cast 

 Ajay Devgan as Prashant Verma
 Raveena Tandon as Priya
 Aloknath as Professor
 Shakti Kapoor as Bharat Acharya
 Amrish Puri as Tau 
 Satyendra Kapoor as Monto
 Shafi Inamdar as ACP Anand Deshmukh
 Natasha Sinha as  Shalini Verma
 Anjan Srivastav as Pandey
 Dinesh Hingoo as Rustam
 Pankaj Berry as Francis
 Deep Dhillon as Lalla
 Manohar Singh as Priya's Father
Khosrow Khaleghpanah as Fighter
Ragesh Asthana as Sunil Gupta only Photo in photo frame (uncredited)

Soundtrack 
Sameer wrote the songs.

References

External links 
 

1993 films
1990s Hindi-language films
1990s action drama films
Films scored by Nadeem–Shravan
Indian action drama films
Films about journalism
Films about journalists
Indian films about revenge